The 16th Annual GMA Dove Awards were held on 1985 recognizing accomplishments of musicians for the year 1984. The show was held in Nashville, Tennessee.

Award recipients
Song of the Year
"Upon This Rock"; Gloria Gaither, Dony McGuire; Gaither Music, lt's-N-Me Music, Lexicon Music (ASCAP)
Songwriter of the Year
Michael W. Smith
Male Vocalist of the Year
Steve Green
Female Vocalist of the Year
Sandi Patti
Artist of the Year
Sandi Patti
Southern Gospel Album of the Year
The Best Of And A Whole Lot More; Rex Nelon Singers; Ken Harding; Canaan
Inspirational Album of the Year
Songs from the Heart; Sandi Patti; Greg Nelson, Sandi Patti Helvering; Impact
Pop/Contemporary Album of the Year
Straight Ahead; Amy Grant; Brown Bannister; Myrrh Records
Contemporary Gospel Album of the Year (formerly Contemporary Black Gospel)
No Time To Lose; Andrae Crouch; Bill Maxwell; Light
Traditional Gospel Album of the Year (formerly Traditional Black Gospel)
Sailin'''; Shirley Caesar; Sanchez Harley, Shirley Caesar, David Lehman; Myrrh
Instrumentalist
Phil Driscoll
Praise and Worship Album of the YearThe Praise In Us; Neal Joseph; Myrrh
Children's Music Album of the YearTen New Songs With Kids For Kids About Life; Ron W. Griffin; Word
Musical AlbumThe Race Is On; Steve Taylor; Word
Recorded Music Packaging of the Year
Eddie Yip; Stan Evenson; Don Putnam; Kingdom Of Love; Scott Wesley Brown
Album by a Secular ArtistYou Were Loving Me''; Lulu Roman Smith; Gary McSpadden; Canaan

External links
 https://doveawards.com/awards/past-winners/

GMA Dove Awards
1985 music awards
1985 in Tennessee
1985 in American music
GMA